Smetanka (Russian: Сметанка) was an Arabian stallion who was a foundation sire of the Orlov trotter.  Count Alexey Orlov of Russia obtained many Arabians, including Smetanka, from the nobility of the Ottoman Empire and other sources tracing to the Bedouin of the Arabian peninsula.  Orlov paid 60,000 Russian rubles for Smetanka, in a time when stallions in Russia sold for approximately 5,000 rubles.

References
"History of the Russian Arabian", web site, accessed May 9, 2006
 

Individual Arabian and part-Arabian horses
Foundation horse sires